Sean Scully (born 28 September 1947) is an Australian actor, active in film and television, most especially serials.

Early life
The son of actress and radio host Margaret Christensen, Scully was born in Sydney, New South Wales.

Career
Scully began his acting career at the age of 12 in the 1960 Children's Film Foundation film Hunted in Holland, which won the Diploma of Honour at the Cannes Film Festival. Following that, he was signed by Walt Disney and starred in a number of Technicolor family feature films for the studio, including The Prince and the Pauper (filmed 1961, released 1962), in which he played both title characters, alongside Guy Williams as Miles Hendon, and also played opposite Patrick McGoohan in Dr. Syn, Alias the Scarecrow (1963).

Scully also starred in the 1962 Walt Disney movie Almost Angels.  He played Peter, a member of the Vienna Boys' Choir whose voice is near to breaking.  He is extremely jealous of Toni Fiala, played by Vincent Winter, who is the new boy with a wonderful clear treble voice. Ultimately, however, the two boys become friends. The film was retitled Born To Sing in the UK.

In his mid-teens, Scully found acting jobs unavailable, and he worked in a wood yard.

On Broadway, Scully appeared in The Girl Who Came to Supper (1963). He also acted on stage and on radio in Australia.

Personal life
He was married to actress Wendy Hughes from 1971 to 1973. After their divorce, he remained a close friend of Ms. Hughes until her death from cancer in 2014.

Filmography
His feature credits include:
Hunted in Holland (1960)
The Prince and The Pauper (1962)
Almost Angels (1962)
Dr. Syn, Alias the Scarecrow (1963)
A City's Child (1972)
Sunday Too Far Away (1975)
Eliza Fraser (1976)
Departure (1986)
Heaven Tonight (1990)
The Doctor Blake Mysteries (2017)
He has appeared on television soap operas, having been a regular cast member on:Bellbird (as Ron Wilson)Sons and Daughters (as Jim O'Brien)Prisoner (as Dan Moulton)Sara Dane (as Louis de Bourget)Echo Point (as Neville Loman)

Other TV credits include:HomicideMatlock PoliceDivision 4TandarraPower Without GloryChopper SquadBellamyA Country PracticeSpecial SquadThe Flying DoctorsPolice RescueG.P.PhoenixFirePacific DriveMedivacNeighboursBlue HeelersStingersTheatre
Scully's sole Broadway theatre credit to date is The Girl Who Came to Supper'' (1963).

References

External links
 
 Official Website

1947 births
Living people
Australian male film actors
Australian male musical theatre actors
Australian male soap opera actors
Male actors from Sydney
20th-century Australian male actors
21st-century Australian male actors